Lissotesta mammillata is a species of sea snail, a marine gastropod mollusk, unassigned in the superfamily Seguenzioidea.

Description
The shell grows to a height of 1.6 mm.

Distribution
This marine species occurs off the Antarctic Peninsula.

References

mammillata
Gastropods described in 1912